Statistics of Division 2 in the 1965–66 season.

Overview
It was contested by 19 teams, and Stade Reims won the championship.

League standings

References

Ligue 2 seasons
French
2